The women's 1500 m speed skating competition for the 2002 Winter Olympics was held in Salt Lake City, Utah, United States.

Anni Friesinger came to terms with the pressure of being the favorite by skating a world record and winning the gold medal. Sabine Völker and Jennifer Rodriguez repeated their successes from the 1000 m.

Records

Prior to this competition, the existing world and Olympic records were as follows.

The following new world and Olympic records were set during this competition.

Results

References

Women's speed skating at the 2002 Winter Olympics
Women's events at the 2002 Winter Olympics